Oxyomus sylvestris is a species of aphodiine dung beetle in the family Scarabaeidae. It occurs in Europe, the Near East, and North Africa. It is saprophagous rather than a "true" dung beetle.

References

Further reading

External links

 
 

Scarabaeidae
Beetles of North Africa
Beetles of Asia
Beetles of Europe
Beetles described in 1763
Taxa named by Giovanni Antonio Scopoli